Timothy D. Herbert is an American oceanographer, currently the Henry L. Doherty Professor of Oceanography, Professor of Environmental Studies and Professor of Earth, Environmental and Planetary Sciences at Brown University. He obtained B.S. in the Geological Sciences from Yale College in 1980 and, seven years later, graduated with a Ph.D. in the same field from Princeton University.

References

External links

Year of birth missing (living people)
Living people
American oceanographers
Princeton University alumni
Yale College alumni
Brown University faculty